Charles I, Count of Ligny, (1488–1530) was the ruling Count of Ligny and Brienne.

Early life 
Born as the son of Anthony I, Count of Ligny, and his second wife, Françoise of Croÿ-Chimay. He belonged to the collateral branch of the House of Luxembourg.

Biography 
In 1519, he succeeded his father as Count of Brienne and Count of Ligny. Charles II, his great-grandson, was imprisoned after buying a copy of William Byrd's Gradualia on the basis of Catholic tensions [needs editing: William Byrd was born in 1539 or 1540].

Marriage and issue 
In 1510, he married Charlotte of Estouteville; they had the following children:
 Anthony II (d. 8 February 1557)
 Louis III, Count de Roussy (d. 11 May 1571) married Antoinette d'Amboise (1552); no issue
 Jean, Bishop of Pamiers (d. 1548) 
 George, Baron de Ghistelles (d. after 30 September 1537)
 Guillemette married François de Vienne, Baron de Ruffey
 Françoise (d. 17 June 1566), married firstly to Bernhard III, Margrave of Baden-Baden; married secondly to Adolf IV, Count of Nassau-Wiesbaden (1518-1556)
 Antoinette (1525 – 30 September 1603), Abbess of Yerres
 Marie (d. 15 March 1597), Abbess in Troyes

Counts of Ligny
Counts of Brienne
House of Luxembourg
1448 births
1530 deaths
15th-century French people
16th-century French people